Yucca reverchonii  is a plant in the family Asparagaceae. It is native to the Edwards Plateau region of Texas, as well as to the Mexican states of Tamaulipas, Nuevo León, Coahuila, Chihuahua, Durango, Zacatecas, Aguascalientes, and San Luís Potosí. It is known as the San Angelo yucca and is closely related to Y. rupicola Scheele and Y. thompsoniana Trel.

Characters that distinguish this species include:
 Low, trunkless growth form, forming scattered colonies on limestone. 
 Leaves lack curling "hairs" on edges, and are very finely toothed. 
 Leaves nearly flat, straight (little or no twist), and usually less than 15 mm wide.

References

Flora of Mexico
reverchonii
Plants described in 1911
Taxa named by William Trelease